The house of Machiavelli, also referred to as L'Albergaccio (literally "The Bad Hotel"), was the place where Niccolò Machiavelli lived during his exile from Florence. This is located in Sant'Andrea in Percussina in San Casciano in Val di Pesa, in the province of Florence, Tuscany, Italy

L'Albergaccio

Niccolò Machiavelli (1469 - 1527) was secretary to the Second Chancery of the Republic of Florence from 1498 to 1512, when the Medici were out of power. Machiavelli lived in this house when he was exiled from Florence when the Medici came back in power in 1512. This house, including the attached tavern L'Albergaccio, is described in one of his most famous letters to Francesco Vettori from 10 December 1513. In this letter, Machiavelli described his typical day characterized by daily work to run the farm and the nights spent in the restaurant playing with the owner and the local butcher. He spent the rest of the night reading, and writing his most important book entitled The Prince (De Principatibus: il Principe), a masterpiece of modern political science.

The house is still owned by the Machiavelli family and more recently inherited by the noble florentine family Serristori. In the last years the house is rather owned by the Gruppo Italiano Vini which has made the house one of its most prestigious vineyard. Today is possible to visit the house, its wine cellar, and via an underground path it is possible to visit the tavern already described by Machiavelli.

Niccolò Machiavelli
San Casciano in Val di Pesa
Buildings and structures in the Metropolitan City of Florence